Jerry Dean Lumpe (June 2, 1933 – August 15, 2014) was an American professional baseball player and coach. He had a 12-season career in Major League Baseball, primarily as a second baseman, for the New York Yankees (1956–1959), Kansas City Athletics (1959–1963) and Detroit Tigers (1964–1967), played in two World Series, and was selected to the 1964 American League All-Star team. Named for National Baseball Hall of Fame pitcher Jerome "Dizzy" Dean, Lumpe was born in Lincoln, Missouri.

Lumpe was raised in Warsaw, Missouri, where he graduated from high school. He signed with the Yankees as a shortstop in 1951. Lumpe and future MLB teammate Norm Siebern had been basketball players together for Missouri State University (then known as Southwest Missouri State), where they won two NAIA Championships in 1952 and 1953, although both needed to miss some tournament games to report to baseball spring training camp. Lumpe maintained strong ties to the university and died in 2014 in Springfield, Missouri, the school's home.

Playing career

New York Yankees
Lumpe rose through the Yankee farm system during the early 1950s, although he missed part of the 1953 and all of the 1954 minor league seasons while performing military service. In between, he batted .279 in 129 games at Triple-A Richmond. He then began  at Richmond, batting .297 in 98 games, and was recalled to New York in July. 

With another young player, Bobby Richardson, installed as the club's second baseman, and Gil McDougald and Tony Kubek at shortstop, Lumpe started 21 games at third base, and appeared in 40 contests, hitting a robust .340 with 35 hits. He also appeared in three games of the 1957 World Series as the Yankees' starting third baseman in Games 3, 5 and 6. Lumpe collected four hits, all singles, in 14 at bats (including three additional appearances as a pinch hitter), and two runs batted in, but the Milwaukee Braves triumphed in seven games. In , his first full year as a major leaguer, Lumpe earned a world championship ring. He appeared in 81 games, with 54 starts at third base, and hit his first three MLB home runs, as the Yankees won another American League pennant. Then, in the 1958 World Series, a rematch with the Braves, he again was the Yankees' starting third baseman in three games, including the decisive Game 7, won by New York 6–2 for the 18th title in the team's history.

Kansas City Athletics
But Lumpe could not break into the Yankees' regular lineup. In , again beginning the season as a utility infielder, he was hitting only .222 in 18 games when he was dealt to the second-division Kansas City Athletics on May 26 with pitchers Johnny Kucks and Tom Sturdivant for outfielder Héctor López and pitcher Ralph Terry. Lumpe started 54 games as Kansas City's second baseman and 47 as their shortstop, although he still showed rust at the plate, hitting only .243 with the Athletics in 108 games. In , Lumpe's first year as a starting second baseman, he began to find his stride. He raised his batting average to .271 and led his club in hits with 156. In 1961, Lumpe batted .293 with 167 hits, including nine triples, second in the American League. Then, in 1962, he batted .301, with ten homers and 83 RBI. He was second the league in hits with 193, second again in triples (ten), fifth in doubles (34) and eighth in batting average. All were personal bests, and Lumpe finished 25th in voting for the Junior Circuit's MVP race.

Detroit Tigers

After a solid  campaign with Kansas City, when he batted .271 in 157 games, he was traded along with Dave Wickersham and Ed Rakow from the Athletics to the Detroit Tigers for Rocky Colavito, Bob Anderson and $50,000 on November 18. The lowly Athletics were making room for young second baseman Dick Green, who would be a fixture on the Oakland Athletics' early 1970s dynasty. Lumpe, in turn, became the first-string second baseman for the first-division Tigers, playing alongside shortstop Dick McAuliffe. Lumpe did not appear in the July 7 contest at Shea Stadium, won by the National League on Johnny Callison's walk-off home run. In , the year of a feverish, four-team pennant race featuring the Tigers, McAuliffe moved over from shortstop to become the club's second baseman, and Lumpe hit .232 in 81 contests, with only 59 appearances in the field. He started the final game of the year on October 1 in the second game of a doubleheader against the California Angels; the Tigers needed to win to clinch a tie for the pennant with the Boston Red Sox. He singled in his only at bat before being replaced by Dick Tracewski in the third inning. Detroit dropped the game, 8–5, handing the championship to the Red Sox. Lumpe retired as an active player upon his unconditional release 19 days later.

Career statistics
In 12 MLB seasons, Jerry Lumpe played in 1,371 games and had 4,912 at bats. He scored 620 runs with 1,314 hits, 190 doubles, 52 triples, 47 home runs, 454 RBI, 20 stolen bases, 428 walks, and a .268 average, .325 on-base percentage, .356 slugging percentage, 1,749 total bases, 57 sacrifice hits, 36 sacrifice flies and 21 intentional walks. Defensively, he recorded a .980 fielding percentage playing at second and third base and shortstop. In 12 World Series games (1957–1958), Lumpe collected six hits, all singles, in 26 at bats (.231), with two runs batted in. In the field, at third base, he handled 15 total chances without committing an error.

Lumpe returned to the game for one season, as the first-base coach of the Oakland Athletics on the staff of his former Kansas City teammate Dick Williams. The 1971 Athletics won the American League West Division championship on the strength of 101 regular-season victories, but dropped the 1971 ALCS to the Baltimore Orioles in three straight games. Lumpe then stepped down from the Oakland coaching staff, ending his MLB career. After leaving baseball, he worked in banking and insurance.

References

External links

Richard Goldstein: Jerry Lumpe, Infielder for Yankees in 2 World Series, Dies at 81. Obituary in The New York Times from August 18, 2014.

1933 births
2014 deaths
American League All-Stars
Baseball players from Missouri
Binghamton Triplets players
Birmingham Barons players
Detroit Tigers players
Joplin Miners players
Kansas City Athletics players
Kansas City Blues (baseball) players
Major League Baseball first base coaches
Major League Baseball second basemen
McAlester Rockets players
New York Yankees players
Oakland Athletics coaches
People from Benton County, Missouri
Richmond Virginians (minor league) players